Puskás Akadémia Football Club II, commonly known as Puskás Akadémia II, is a football club based in Felcsút, Hungary, that competes in the Nemzeti Bajnokság III, the top flight of Hungarian football.

History
The club was established in 2005 as the reserve team of Puskás Akadémia. The club is currently in NB III, the third Hungarian league.

Honours
Nemzeti Bajnokság III
    Third Place (1): 2018–19

Current squad

League and cup history

{|class="wikitable"
|-bgcolor="#efefef"
! Season
! Div.
! Pos.
! Pl.
! W
! D
! L
! GS
! GA
! P
!Domestic Cup
!colspan=2|Europe
!Notes
|-bgcolor=White
|align=center|2015–16
|align=center|3th
|align=center|11
|align=center|39
|align=center|11
|align=center|6
|align=center|15
|align=center|56
|align=center|53
|align=center|39
|align=center|
|align=center|
|align=center|
|align=center|
|-bgcolor=White
|align=center|2016–17
|align=center|3th
|align=center|6
|align=center|51
|align=center|16
|align=center|3
|align=center|13
|align=center|54
|align=center|38
|align=center|51
|align=center|
|align=center|
|align=center|
|align=center|
|-bgcolor=White
|align=center|2017–18
|align=center|3th
|align=center|4
|align=center|53
|align=center|15
|align=center|5
|align=center|9
|align=center|57
|align=center|34
|align=center|53
|align=center|
|align=center|
|align=center|
|align=center|
|-bgcolor=White
|align=center|2018–19
|align=center|3th
|align=center|3
|align=center|50
|align=center|13
|align=center|11
|align=center|6
|align=center|53
|align=center|40
|align=center|41
|align=center|
|align=center|
|align=center|
|align=center|
|-bgcolor=White
|align=center|2019–20
|align=center|3th
|align=center|11
|align=center|32
|align=center|5
|align=center|1
|align=center|8
|align=center|23
|align=center|22
|align=center|14
|align=center|
|align=center|
|align=center|
|align=center|
|-bgcolor=White
|align=center|2020–21
|align=center|3th
|align=center|8
|align=center|38
|align=center|17
|align=center|5
|align=center|16
|align=center|66
|align=center|51
|align=center|56
|align=center|
|align=center|
|align=center|
|align=center|
|-bgcolor=White
|align=center|2021–22
|align=center|3th
|align=center|
|align=center|
|align=center|
|align=center|
|align=center|
|align=center|
|align=center|
|align=center|
|align=center|
|align=center|
|align=center|
|}

See also
 Puskás Akadémia FC

References

External links
Ferenc Puskás Football Academy II official site

 
 
Fehérvár FC
Football academies in Europe
2015 establishments in Hungary
UEFA Youth League teams
Association football clubs established in 2005